Otto Placht (born 1962) is a Czech artist based in Peru.

Placht paints on mesquite wood which has been previously colored using the pigment from bark, vines and fruit from the neighboring plants.

Placht is featured in a documentary Painter of the Jungle. It documents Placht's life in Peru: his family life in the Indian village; the tradition of creating Indian ceramics; the ritual of preparing and drinking "iahuaska"; his attempt of finding his place and creating the art therapy center in Peru.

External links
 Impresse Exhibition at Rudolfinum 
 Pictures 
Creating the cosmos in public view in The Prague Post

References 

Czech painters
Czech male painters
Living people
1962 births